Walter Pollak (1887–1940) was a 20th-century American civil liberties lawyer, who established important precedents while working with other leading radical lawyers in the 1920s and 1930s. His best known cases involved the defense before the Supreme Court of Communist Benjamin Gitlow and the Scottsboro Boys.

Background

Walter Heilprin Pollak was born on June 4, 1887, in Summit, New Jersey to Gustav Pollak (born circa 1849 in Vienna, Austria; died 1919) and Celia Heilprin in a family of "bookish, nonreligious Jews" who had come to the States in the 1850s. His father was an editor and writer for The Nation magazine.  He had two older siblings: a brother, Francis D. Pollak (born in 1876), who also became a lawyer, and a sister, Meta Pollak (born in 1879). Walter Pollak attended DeWitt Clinton High School and then Columbia University in New York City.  In 1907, he graduated from Harvard University and in 1910 from Harvard Law School.

Career

Pollak first joined the law firm of Sullivan and Cromwell but within two years had moved to Simpson, Warren and Cardozo, where he started a lifelong friendship with Benjamin N. Cardozo (who in 1913 left the firm to become a New York Supreme Court Justice). Pollak stayed on, and the firm eventually became Engelhard, Pollak, Pitcher, Stern and Clarke.

During the 1920s, according to Max Lowenthal, Pollak was part of a "loose partnership" of radical attorneys that included Joseph R. Brodsky, Swinburne Hale, Walter Nelles, Isaac Shorr, Carol Weiss King, and King's brother-in-law Carl Stern.

In 1925, on behalf of the American Civil Liberties Union (ACLU), he argued his first case before the United States Supreme Court, Gitlow v. New York, defending Communist Party member Benjamin Gitlow against a conviction for "advocacy of criminal anarchy." The court upheld Gitlow's conviction but importantly recognized that the due process clause of the 14th Amendment incorporated and thus protected fundamental provisions of the Bill of Rights, including the freedom of speech. (New York State Governor Al Smith commuted Gitlow's sentence.)

In the early 1930s, on behalf of International Labor Defense, Pollak joined the defense team of the Scottsboro Boys with Joseph R. Brodsky. He took an active part in framing the appeals in Powell v. Alabama (1932), as well as Norris v. Alabama and Patterson v. Alabama (both 1935), the latter of which he argued with the support of the ACLU.

In 1937, during the Great Depression, the firm dissolved. Pollak became of counsel to Cohen, Cole, Weiss, and Wharton (which became Paul, Weiss, Rifkind, Wharton and Garrison).

Personal and death

Pollak was the father of United States District Court for the Eastern District of Pennsylvania Judge Louis Heilprin Pollak, a former dean of both Yale Law School and the University of Pennsylvania Law School.

Walter Pollak was a close friend of law professor Zechariah Chafee Jr.

Pollak died on October 2, 1940, age 53, of a heart attack.

See also

 Louis H. Pollak
 Benjamin N. Cardozo
 Joseph R. Brodsky
 Carol Weiss King
 Benjamin Gitlow 
 Scottsboro Boys
 American Civil Liberties Union 
 International Labor Defense
 Powell v. Alabama (1932) 
 Norris v. Alabama (1935)
 Patterson v. Alabama (1935)

References

External sources

 
 
 

1887 births
1941 deaths
20th-century American lawyers
Paul, Weiss, Rifkind, Wharton & Garrison people
Harvard Law School alumni
Sullivan & Cromwell people
DeWitt Clinton High School alumni
Harvard College alumni